

Siegfried Haenicke (8 September 1878  – 19 February 1946) was a general in the Wehrmacht of Nazi Germany during World War II who commanded the XXXVIII Army Corps. He was a recipient of both the Pour le Mérite and Knight's Cross of the Iron Cross. 

From 30 September 1942, he became military commander of Wehrkreis General Government (Poland), renamed Befehlshaber Heeresgebiet Generalgouvernement in October 1944. In this function, he ordered the participation of the Wehrmacht in the suppression of an uprising of the prisoners in the extermination camp Sobibor in October 1943. On 31 January 1945, he was transferred back to the Führer reserve.

Haenicke was arrested by the Soviets in 1945, and died in 1946 in NKVD Special Camp No. 1.

Awards 
 Pour le Mérite on 14 June 1918 as hauptmann and commander of II Battalion, 150th Infantry Regiment

 Knight's Cross of the Iron Cross on 17 September 1941 as generalleutnant and commander of 61st Infantry Division

See also
List of the Pour le Mérite (military class) recipients

References

Citations

Bibliography

 

1878 births
1946 deaths
People from Konstanz
People from the Grand Duchy of Baden
German Army generals of World War II
Generals of Infantry (Wehrmacht)
German Army personnel of World War I
Recipients of the Gold German Cross
Recipients of the Knight's Cross of the Iron Cross
Recipients of the Pour le Mérite (military class)
German prisoners of war in World War II held by the Soviet Union
People who died in NKVD Special Camp No. 1
Recipients of the clasp to the Iron Cross, 1st class
Major generals of the Reichswehr
Military personnel from Baden-Württemberg
Nazi war criminals
Nazis who died in prison custody